Swedish jazz was introduced in Sweden during the 1920s, and was spread through dancehalls and concerts. During the 1930s and 1940s the popularity was increasing, together with increasing record sales. It was by this time that the first jazz clubs was started in Sweden.

The golden age of Swedish jazz is considered to be during the 1950s, with artists like Arne Domnérus, Lars Gullin, Alice Babs and Monica Zetterlund.

East-West Records was a jazz record label active during the 1950s which featured American and Swedish musicians.

The Stockholm Jazz Festival was established in 1980.

Musicians

Peter Asplund: Trumpeter, born 1969.
Dan Berglund: Double bassist, born 1963.
Magnus Broo
Gunhild Carling
Lars Danielsson
Palle Danielsson
Lars Jansson
Lars Edegran
Lisa Ekdahl
Lars Erstrand
: Drummer, born 1976.
Per-Ola Gadd: Double bassist, born 1962.
Lars Gulliksson
Lars Gullin
Mats Gustafsson
Rigmor Gustafsson
Bengt Hallberg
Jonas Hellborg
Jan Johansson
: Saxophonist, born 1969.
Per "Texas" Johansson
Anders Jormin
: Trumpeter, born 1970.
Jacob Karlzon
Orange Kellin
Jonas Kullhammar
Åke Hasselgård
Nils Landgren
Magnus Lindgren
: Saxophonist, born 1965.
Sture Nordin
Bent Persson
Mats Rondin
Bernt Rosengren
: Saxophonist, born 1942.
Fredrika Stahl
Bobo Stenson
Esbjörn Svensson
Gösta Törner
Ulf Wakenius
Per Henrik Wallin
Putte Wickman
Monica Zetterlund
: Pianist, born 1963.
Magnus Öström: Drummer, born 1965.
Rune Öfwerman

Bands
Koop
The Torbjörn Zetterberg Hot Five

References

External links
Swedish Jazz Association

 
Music scenes